Journey Through a Small Planet is a memoir written by Emanuel Litvinoff.

Synopsis

In Journey Through a Small Planet (1972), the writer Emanuel Litvinoff recalls his working-class Jewish childhood in the East End of London: a small cluster of streets right next to the city, but worlds apart in culture and spirit. With vivid intensity Litvinoff describes the overcrowded tenements of Brick Lane and Whitechapel, the smell of pickled herring and onion bread, the rattle of sewing machines and chatter in Yiddish. He also relates stories of his parents, who fled from Russia in 1914, his experiences at school and a brief flirtation with Communism. Unsentimental, vital and almost dream like, this is a masterly evocation of a long-vanished world.

External links
 Journey Through a Small Planet (2008 release) on Amazon.co.uk 

1972 non-fiction books
Books about London
British memoirs
History of the London Borough of Tower Hamlets